The Asian Karatedo Championships are the highest level of competition for sport karate in Asia.  The competition is held in a different country every two years organized by the Asian Karatedo Federation (AKF) under the supervision of World Karate Federation (WKF), the largest international governing body of sport karate with over 180 member countries. It is the only karate organization recognised by the International Olympic Committee and has more than fifty million members. The AKF organizes the Junior and Senior Asian Karatedo Championships in every two years in between the Olympic and Asian Games and participates in WKF World Karate Championships which its member Japan play as a powerhouse country when it comes to sport karate vying for world titles with counterpart opponents from the powerful nations such as France, United Kingdom, Netherlands, Spain and Italy in many world championships.

Asian Senior Karate Championships

Asian Cadet, Junior and U-21yrs Karate Championships

See also

 World Karate Championships
 Karate at the Asian Games
 World Cadet, Junior and U21 Karate Championships

External links
 Asian Karate Championships
 World Karate Federation Official Website
 Championship winners and hosts - World Karate Federation.
 WKF Karate Records
  AKF Senior, Junior and Cadet Championship results and information
 Malaysia Karate

 
Karate competitions
Karate
Karate in Asia
Recurring sporting events established in 1993